Brachyctis rugulosa is a species of beetle in the family Carabidae, the only species in the genus Brachyctis.

References

Lebiinae